"Endless Summer" is a song by German singer Oceana Mahlmann, from her second album My House (2012), serving as the lead single. It was the official song of the UEFA Euro 2012 held in Poland and Ukraine

The song is prominently based on the synth part of Alexandra Stan's 2010 single "Mr. Saxobeat". It also uses a sample of the electro track "Blaue Moschee" by German project Die Vögel.

An excerpt of the song can be heard on the UEFA Euro 2012 video game, with it playing before every match in the tournament modes as well as in the intro.

Charts and certifications

Weekly charts

Year-end charts

Certifications

References

2012 singles
Number-one singles in Poland
Football songs and chants
2011 songs
UEFA Euro 2012
UEFA European Championship official songs and anthems